Walter Jackson may refer to:

 Walter Jackson (ice hockey)
 Walter Jackson (footballer), English footballer
 Walter Jackson (singer) (1938–1983), American soul music singer
 Walter Jackson, winner of the 2022 NAIDOC Award for Caring for Country and Culture
 Walter Jesse Jackson, English rugby union player
 Walter K. Jackson, member of the Pennsylvania House of Representatives
 Walter Montgomery Jackson, American encyclopedist
 Wattie Jackson, Scottish footballer